Drumraney is a civil parish in County Westmeath, Ireland.

Drumraney is one of 4 civil parishes in the barony of Kilkenny West in the Province of Leinster.

Drumraney civil parish comprises the village of Drumraney and 40 townlands: Ardborra, Ardbuckan, Ardnagragh, Ardnagragh Digby, Ardnagragh Gray, Ballycloghduff, Ballycloghduff (Molston), Ballynalone, Ballysallagh, Baskin High, Baskin Low, Bleachlawn, Bryanmore Lower, Bryanmore Upper, Byanbeg Lower, Byanbeg Upper, Carrickaneha, Cartroncoragh, Cauran, Cloghbreen, Cormaclew, Corr, Curraghbane, Curraghroodle, Drumraney, Dunnamona, Fairfield, Fearmore, Kilcornan, Killeennanam, Killininneen, Kiltober, Lissanode, Newgrove, Oldtown or Puddingstreet, Pishanagh, Streamstown, Toorbeg and Walderstown.

The neighbouring civil parishes are: Noughaval to the north, Ballymore to the east, Ballyloughloe to the south and Kilkenny West to the west.

References

External links
Drumraney civil parish at the IreAtlas Townland Data Base
Drumraney civil parish at townlands.ie
Drumraney civil parish at The Placenames Database of Ireland

Civil parishes of County Westmeath